The Collegium Nobilium, the "College for nobles", was an elite boarding college for the sons of magnates and wealthy nobles (szlachta), founded in 1740 in Warsaw by the Piarist intellectual, Stanisław Konarski, and run by his religious brethren. It is often confused with another short-lived college foundation in Warsaw of the same name, only founded by the Jesuits in 1752 and serving the same demographic. That one was forced to close as a result of the suppression of the Society of Jesus in Western Europe in 1777.

History
The Piarist school existed until 1832 and was one of the predecessors of Warsaw University. It was initially called Collegium Novum, but its name was changed in the autumn of 1741. It operated in a building on Warsaw's Długa Street. Later, it was moved to the district of Żoliborz. The aim of the Collegium Nobilium was to educate future leaders of the Polish–Lithuanian Commonwealth, and to prepare them to run the country (see also Great Sejm, Constitution of 3 May 1791). The curriculum was spread over eight years, with grades II, IV, and V, consisting of two year cycles. The school had an unusual syllabus for the time, concentrating on natural sciences, mathematics, philosophy and modern languages, and with less emphasis on Latin and Greek. Stanisław Konarski selected well-educated teachers and introduced courses in history, law, economics and science.

The Collegium Nobilium building was almost completely destroyed during the Warsaw Uprising. It was rebuilt after the war, together with its classical façade.

Other Piarist schools
 Wilno
 Lwów

Notable alumni
 Tadeusz Rejtan
 Roman Ignacy Potocki
 Stanisław Kostka Potocki
 Zenon Kazimierz Wysłouch

See also
 Szkoła Rycerska
 Jazłowiec College

References

Education in Warsaw
Educational institutions established in 1740
History of Warsaw
Piarist Order
1832 disestablishments
Defunct schools in Poland
Universities and colleges in the Polish–Lithuanian Commonwealth
Buildings and structures in Masovian Voivodeship
Educational institutions disestablished in 1832